Story Mound may refer to:

 Story Mound (Cincinnati, Ohio), listed on the NRHP in Cincinnati, Ohio
  Story Mound State Memorial, listed on the NRHP in Ross County, Ohio